Kattama (both ), katlama, katmer, qatlama Azerbaijani , катма Bulgarian , qator gambir is a fried layered bread common in the cuisines of Central Asia. Qatlama in traditional Turkish means "folded", which comes from the verb qatlamaq "to fold", likely referring to the traditional method of preparation. The Turkish variety katmer is made as a dessert with kaymak (clotted cream,) and like many other delicacies from Gaziantep, is also filled and topped with pistachios.

Turkish  Regional Katmer Styles
Sivas Katmeri
Antep katmeri 
Kilis Katmeri

References

Flatbreads
Kazakhstani cuisine
Kyrgyz cuisine
Mongolian cuisine
Turkish cuisine
Azerbaijani cuisine